Leonardo Mayer was the defending champion but decided not to participate.
Horacio Zeballos defeated Paul Capdeville 3–6, 7–5, 7–6(7–2) in the final.

Seeds

Draw

Finals

Top half

Bottom half

References
 Main Draw
 Qualifying Draw

Sao Leo Open - Singles
2012 Singles